Tshitenge Mukandila (24 March 1982 – 25 September 2010) was a Congolese football midfielder.

References 

1984 births
2010 deaths
Democratic Republic of the Congo footballers
Democratic Republic of the Congo international footballers
Association football midfielders
Democratic Republic of the Congo expatriate footballers
Expatriate footballers in Rwanda
Democratic Republic of the Congo expatriate sportspeople in Rwanda
AS Saint-Luc players
TP Mazembe players
SC Cilu players
APR F.C. players
Daring Club Motema Pembe players